Womboota is a locality in the centre south part of the Riverina.

Womboota is located in the Deniliquin land district and the Murray River Council and is on the Balranald branch line of the Deniliquin railway line.

Womboota Post Office opened on 1 July 1899 and closed in 1979.

References

External links

Towns in the Riverina
Towns in New South Wales
Murray River Council